Goodbye, Dr. Fate is the second full-length record by the punk rock band Trusty, released on Dischord Records in 1995.

Less cryptic than The Fourth Wise Man, which the group recorded two years later, Goodbye is lighter, with a more conventional pop sound. The title is presumably a reference to the comic book character Doctor Fate.
 
Goodbye, Dr. Fate

 There Goes Sally
 "Goodbye, Dr. Fate"
 Joseph and Jennifer
 Boy and His Dog
 King Snake
 Wicked
 Honey Mustard
 4:30
 Shopping List
 Serendipity
 Kal-el
 A Modest Proposal
 Wife
 The Tale of the Swazi Pascha and the Tiger

References

External links
 Good Bye, Dr. Fate. allmusic.com. Retrieved February 1, 2016.

1995 albums